Veresk is an alcoholic drink producing company. It is located in Kashin, Russia in the Tver Oblast. 

Veresk was founded in 1901. In 1992, it became a corporation under the name of ОАО «Вереск» (Veresk), and in 1996 it began to be called the open stock corporation «Кашинский ликеро-водоч-ный завод  «Вереск» (Veresk Liquor-Vodka Factory of Kashin).

Products

Bitter brewed beverage "ТВЕРСКАЯ" (Tverskaya)
Brewed beverage "ТВЕРСКАЯ брусничная" (Tverskaya Brusnichanya)
Brewed beverage "РЯБИНОВАЯ на коньяке" (Riabnovaya na konyake)
Brewed beverage "СМОРОДИНОВАЯ" (Smorodinaya)
Brewed beverage "ЧЕРЕМУХОВАЯ" (Cheremuhovaya)
Brewed beverage "КЛЮКВЕННАЯ" (Klyukvenaya)
Bitter brewed beverage "ДЖИН" (Gin)
Bitter brewed beverage "ВЕРЕСКОВЫЙ МЕД " (Vereskovyi Med)
Tonic "СТАРЫЙ КАШИН" (Staryi Kashin)
Vodka "МИРОВАЯ" (Mirovaya)
Vodka "ПРЕСТОЛЬНАЯ" (Prestolnaya)
Vodka "АФАНАСИЙ НИКИТИН" (Afanasii Nikitin)
Vodka "ХЛЕБНАЯ особая" (Hlebnaya Osobaya)
Vodka "ТВЕРЬ" (Tver)
Vodka "РУССКАЯ особая" (Ruskaya Osobaya)
Low alcohol cocktails
Mineral water "АННА КАШИНСКАЯ" (Anna Kashinskaya)
Cream-liqueur "СОЛО" (Solo) with cream 
Liqueur "КОФЕЙНЫЙ" (Kofeinyi)

External links
Veresk

Food and drink companies established in 1901
Drink companies of Russia
Distilleries in Russia
Drink companies of the Soviet Union
Companies based in Tver Oblast
1901 establishments in the Russian Empire
Companies nationalised by the Soviet Union